The Telemark Lodge (formally known as the Telemark Resort and Convention Center) was a resort in the lakes district of Bayfield County, Wisconsin. It was located two miles east of the town of Cable, Wisconsin prior to its demolition in April of 2021.

History
Telemark was founded as an alpine ski area by Tony Wise in 1947, one of the first in the United States. A massive lodge was built in 1972 but struggled financially as ski lifts and less costly airfare opened up bigger hills. Telemark added a large facility, the Colosseum, in December 1980, that provided indoor tennis and new facilities for the ski hill and the cross country ski area, which was "partially dismantled" by 1998.

The lodge was a cross country ski destination through the 1980s, but declined along with U.S. cross country skiing. The lodge endured four bankruptcies: one in 1984, a second in 1998, and a third in 2010. The third bankruptcy resulted in a foreclosure of the property, and a closure of the resort. It closed on May 5, 2010, and re-opened again in January 2011 after a sale was made that month. Telemark Hospitality LLC then began an extensive remodeling project during 2011. On April 2, 2013, once again the storied Telemark Lodge and its property closed due to various difficulties including a fourth bankruptcy.

In October 2013, the lodge was purchased by Newco, a private Colorado-based company,
now going by the name of Mount Telemark Properties LLC.
However, renovations were too costly and the Lodge was closed for the 2014 winter season.

Mount Telemark Properties has reportedly offered part of the purchased property (including the lodge itself) to Central Cross Country Ski Association ("CXC") in an effort to preserve the start location of the American Birkebeiner. After years of neglect it was demolished in 2021.

American Birkebeiner
Telemark is home to the American Birkebeiner cross-country skiing event founded by Tony Wise in 1973. Tony got his inspiration for the event from Norway's Birkebeiner. The race alone attracts thousands of skiers and spectators to the resort each year, and in fact is one of the biggest annual events for the resort.

Culinary history
Emeril Lagasse was at Telemark Lodge from 1978 to 1980. Other published biographies say he was in New England during that time period.

Telemark Resort ski hill statistics
 Base: 1320 ft (402 m)
 Summit: 1700 ft (518 m)
 Vertical Rise: 380 ft (115 m)
 46.186673°, -91.250940°

References 

Buildings and structures in Bayfield County, Wisconsin
Tourist attractions in Bayfield County, Wisconsin
Wisconsin culture
Demolished buildings and structures in Wisconsin
Buildings and structures demolished in 2021